The Danube whitefin gudgeon (Romanogobio vladykovi) is a species of freshwater fish in the family Cyprinidae. It is distributed in the Danube drainage. The maximal length is 11.5 cm, maximal reported age 4 years.

Named in honor of ichthyologist Vadim D. Vladykov (1898-1986)

References

Sources
 

Romanogobio
Cyprinid fish of Europe
Fish described in 1943